Bloody Rose is the second book in The Band trilogy, a fantasy series written by Nicholas Eames. The book is the sequel to Kings of the Wyld.

Background 
The series is published by Orbit Books. The first book was influenced by 60s and 70s rock while Bloody Rose is influenced by 80s rock. The third book will be entitled "Outlaw Empire".

Plot 
The story begins six years after the end of Kings of the Wyld. The story is told from the perspective of a bard named Tam who joins the band called Fable, which is led by Bloody Rose. Mercenary bands have taken to fighting monsters in arenas for money rather than adventure into the Heartwyld to obtain a bounty. Tam Hashford auditions for her role as the bard by singing a song called "Together", which was written by her mother.

Reception 
The Publishers Weekly review praises the book saying "This is a messy, glorious romp worthy of multiple encores." Jason Heller wrote at NPR that "[h]umorous twists and pulse-ratcheting action abound in Bloody Rose, but its Eames' knack for heart-wrenching poignancy that makes his warm, wonderful fantasy so harmonious."

Awards

References

External links 

2018 fantasy novels
Young adult fantasy novels
2018 Canadian novels
Canadian young adult novels
Canadian fantasy novels